Robert Zickert (born 23 March 1990) is a German footballer who plays for Chemnitzer FC.

References

External links 
 

1990 births
Living people
People from Falkenberg/Elster
People from Bezirk Cottbus
German footballers
Footballers from Brandenburg
Association football defenders
3. Liga players
Regionalliga players
FC Energie Cottbus II players
FC Carl Zeiss Jena players
1. FC Lokomotive Leipzig players
Chemnitzer FC players